Barbara Hamilton (11 December 1926– 7 February 1996) was a Canadian actress in film, television, theatre and radio.

After studies at Brockville Collegiate Institute, she attended the University of Toronto where her early performances were featured at the Hart House Theatre. She is known for roles in films and television series such as Road to Avonlea. Her theatre performances have included the Spring Thaw review. She is also known for originating the role of Marilla Cuthbert in both the Canadian and West End productions of Anne of Green Gables.

Hamilton died as a result of breast cancer in 1996 at the age of 69. That year, the Toronto Alliance for the Performing Arts established the Barbara Hamilton Award to honour those who demonstrate excellence in the performing arts.

Filmography

Awards and recognition
 Earle Grey Award (1993)

References

External links

 
 Barbara Hamilton at Northern Stars
 

1926 births
Burials at Mount Pleasant Cemetery, Toronto
1996 deaths
Actresses from Kingston, Ontario
Actresses from Toronto
Canadian film actresses
Canadian television actresses
Canadian stage actresses
Canadian voice actresses
Deaths from cancer in Ontario
Deaths from breast cancer
University of Toronto alumni
20th-century Canadian actresses
Canadian Comedy Award winners